Eduards Gešels (born 19 May 1902, date of death unknown) was a Latvian figure skater. He competed in the pairs event at the 1936 Winter Olympics.

References

External links
 

1902 births
Year of death missing
Latvian male pair skaters
Olympic figure skaters of Latvia
Figure skaters at the 1936 Winter Olympics
20th-century Latvian people